Mehram (also Romanized as Mehrām; also known as Bahrām) is a village in Khanamrud Rural District, in the Central District of Heris County, East Azerbaijan Province, Iran. At the 2006 census, its population was 21, in 5 families.

References 

Populated places in Heris County